Bob Gill may refer to:
Bob Gill (artist) (1931–2021), American illustrator and graphic designer
Bob Gill (daredevil) (born 1945), American former world-record holding motorcycle stuntman
Bobby Gill (born 1959), American former NASCAR driver